Willie Park  may refer to:
Willie Park Sr., first winner of The Open Championship in golf
Willie Park Jr., his son, also winner of The Open Championship

See also
William Park (disambiguation)